The Eaglenest Range is a mountain range on the west side of the Spatsizi Plateau in northern British Columbia, Canada.  It has an area of 2448 km2 and is a subrange of the Interior Mountains which in turn form part of the Pacific Cordillera mountain system.

References

Mountain ranges of British Columbia
Stikine Country
Stikine Plateau